David Sanford Kohan (born April 16, 1964) is an American television producer and writer. After writing for The Wonder Years and The Dennis Miller Show, Kohan co-created and produced Will & Grace, Boston Common, Good Morning, Miami, Twins and Four Kings with Max Mutchnick. Kohan has won an Emmy and a People's Choice Award. He has been nominated for a Golden Globe Award. He and his business partner Max Mutchnick worked on a half-hour comedy series for CBS called Partners.

Biography
Kohan was born to a Jewish family in New York City and graduated from Wesleyan University in 1986. He is the son of writer Buz Kohan and novelist Rhea Kohan and the brother of writer/producer Jenji Kohan. He also has a twin brother, Jono.

Kohan and Mutchnik formed a name with their two last names: KoMut Entertainment, which would be the name of the company they own, making Boston Common, Will & Grace, $#*! My Dad Says and Partners. In 1999, it signed a deal with Warner Bros. Television.

On December 11, 2003, NBC filed a lawsuit against Kohan and Mutchnik, claiming that they had to fail to negotiate a contract and a licensee fee for the show. Both sides were settled on April 29, 2007.

He is married to Blair Kohan, a partner and motion picture agent at UTA. He has two daughters (one daughter from a previous marriage).

Filmography

References

External links

1964 births
Living people
Television producers from New York City
American television writers
American male television writers
Writers from New York City
Wesleyan University alumni
American twins
Showrunners
Jewish American writers
Screenwriters from New York (state)
21st-century American Jews
20th-century American Jews
20th-century American screenwriters
20th-century American male writers
21st-century American screenwriters
21st-century American male writers